Temnora grandidieri is a moth of the family Sphingidae. It is known from Madagascar.

It is very similar to Temnora murina, but distinguishable by the dark brown base of the hindwing upperside.

References

Temnora
Moths described in 1879
Moths of Madagascar
Moths of Africa